Pentre-bach (Welsh for "small village") is a hamlet (one of several in Wales with similar names) in Powys, Wales, in the former county and current Shire Committee Area of Breconshire or Brecknockshire. It is located on the Afon Cilieni, a small tributary of the River Usk, between Brecon and Llandovery. The hamlet has a pub called the "Shoemakers Arms" or Tafarn y Crydd, and a former chapel, originally Calvinistic Methodist, named "Beili-du", Welsh for "black yard". The nearest church is in Llandeilo'r-Fan, 2 km to the NW,  and the nearest shop is in Sennybridge, 4 km to the south.

Construction started of a railway line up the Cilieni valley, but was abandoned in 1867. (See Neath and Brecon Railway and.)

References

Populated places in Powys
Hamlets in Wales